Messawa may refer to

Messawa, Indonesia
, a Panamanian coaster in service 1969-76